A translinear circuit is a circuit that carries out its function using the translinear principle. These are current-mode circuits that can be made using transistors that obey an exponential current-voltage characteristic—this includes BJTs and CMOS transistors in weak inversion. Translinearity, in broad sense, is linear dependence of transconductance on current, which occurs in components with exponential current-voltage relationship.

History and etymology
The word translinear (TL) was invented by Barrie Gilbert in 1975 to describe circuits that used the exponential current-voltage relation of BJTs. By using this exponential relationship, this class of circuits can implement multiplication, amplification and power-law relationships. When Barrie Gilbert described this class of circuits he also described the translinear principle (TLP) which made the analysis of these circuits possible in a way that the simplified view of BJTs as linear current amplifiers did not allow. TLP was later extended to include other elements that obey an exponential current-voltage relationship (such as CMOS transistors in weak inversion).

The Translinear Principle
The translinear principle (TLP) is that in a closed loop containing an even number of translinear elements (TEs) with an equal number of them arranged clockwise and counter-clockwise, the product of the currents through the clockwise TEs equals the product of the currents through the counter-clockwise TEs or 

The TLP is dependent on the exponential current-voltage relationship of a circuit element. Thus, an ideal TE follows the relationship

In a circuit, TEs are described as either clockwise (CW) or counterclockwise (CCW). If the arrow on the emitter points clockwise, it's considered a CW TE, if it points counterclockwise, it's considered a CCW TE. Consider an example:

In other words, the voltage drops must equal the voltage increases. When a loop that only goes through the emitter-gate connections of TEs exists, we call it a translinear loop. Mathematically, this becomes

Because of the exponential current-voltage relationship, this implies TLP:

this is effectively because current is used as the signal. Because of this, voltage is the log of the signal and addition in the log domain is like multiplication of the original signal (i.e. ). 
The translinear principle is the rule that, in a translinear loop, the product of the currents through the CW TEs is equal to the product of the currents through the CCW TEs.

For a detailed derivation of the TLP, and physical interpretations of the parameters in the ideal TE law, please refer to or.

Example Translinear Circuits

Squaring Circuit

According to TLP,
.
This means that  where  is the unit scaling current (i.e. the definition of unity for the circuit). This is effectively a squaring circuit where . This particular circuit is designed in what is known as an alternating topology, which means that CW TEs alternate with CCW TEs. Here's the same circuit in a stacked topology.

The same equation applies to this circuit as to the alternating topology according to TLP. Neither of these circuits can be implemented in real life without biasing the transistors such that the currents expected to flow through them can actually do so. Here are some example biasing schemes:

2-Quadrant Multiplier
The design of a 2-quadrant multiplier can be easily done using TLP. The first issue with this circuit is that negative values of currents need to be represented. Since all currents must be positive for the exponential relationship to hold (the log operation is not defined for negative numbers), positive currents must represent negative currents. The way this is done is by defining two positive currents whose difference is the current of interest.

A two quadrant multiplier has the relationship  hold while allowing  to be either positive or negative. Also note that  and  etc. Plugging these values into the original equation yields . By equating the positive and negative portions of the equation, two equations that can be directly built as translinear loops arise:

The following are the alternating loops that implement the desired equations and some biasing schemes for the circuit.

Usage in electronic circuits
The TLP has been used in a variety of circuits including vector arithmetic circuits, current conveyors, current-mode operational amplifiers, and RMS-DC converters. It has been in use since the 1960s (by Gilbert), but was not formalized until 1975. In the 1980s, Evert Seevinck's work helped to create a systematic process for translinear circuit design. In 1990 Seevinck invented a circuit he called a companding current-mode integrator that was effectively a first-order log-domain filter. A version of this was generalized in 1993 by Douglas Frey and the connection between this class of filters and TL circuits was made most explicit in the late 90s work of Jan Mulder et al. where they describe the dynamic translinear principle. More work by Seevinck led to synthesis techniques for extremely low-power TL circuits. More recent work in the field has led to the voltage-translinear principle, multiple-input translinear element networks, and field-programmable analog arrays (FPAAs).

References

Electronic circuits